The Breda-Zappata B.Z.309 was an Italian twin-engined airliner project by Breda.

Design and development
Aircraft designer Filippo Zappata developed a short range twin-engined civil transport for 11 to 15 passengers. The Breda company had financial problems which led to the project being abandoned.

Specifications (estimated)

References

1940s Italian airliners
Twin piston-engined tractor aircraft